Edward Law may refer to:
 Edward Law, 1st Baron Ellenborough (1750–1818)
 Edward Law, 1st Earl of Ellenborough (1790–1871), son of the above
 Edward Law, 5th Baron Ellenborough (1841–1915), grandson of the 1st Baron, nephew of the Earl
 Edward FitzGerald Law (1846–1908), British diplomat